{{DISPLAYTITLE:C18H29NO2}}
The molecular formula C18H29NO2 (molar mass: 291.43 g/mol, exact mass: 291.2198 u) may refer to:

 Exaprolol
 Ketocaine
 Penbutolol